Ur-Nammu (or Ur-Namma, Ur-Engur, Ur-Gur, Sumerian: , ruled c. 2112 BC – 2094 BC middle chronology, or possibly c. 2048–2030 BC short chronology) founded the Sumerian Third Dynasty of Ur, in southern Mesopotamia, following several centuries of Akkadian and Gutian rule. His main achievement was state-building, and Ur-Nammu is chiefly remembered today for his legal code, the Code of Ur-Nammu, the oldest known surviving example in the world. He held the titles of  "King of Ur, and King of Sumer and Akkad".

Reign 

According to the Sumerian King List, Ur-Nammu reigned for 18 years. Year-names are known for 17 of these years, but their order is uncertain. One year-name of his reign records the devastation of Gutium, while two years seem to commemorate his legal reforms ("Year in which Ur-Nammu the king put in order the ways (of the people in the country) from below to above", "Year Ur-Nammu made justice in the land").

Among his military exploits were the conquest of Lagash and the defeat of his former masters at Uruk. He was eventually recognized as a significant regional ruler (of Ur, Eridu, and Uruk) at a coronation in Nippur, and is believed to have constructed buildings at Nippur, Larsa, Kish, Adab, and Umma. He was known for restoring the roads and general order after the Gutian period. It is now known that the reign of Puzur-Inshushinak in Elam overlapped with that of Ur-Nammu. Ur-Nammu, who styled himself "King of Sumer and Akkad" is probably the one who, in his reign, reconquered the territories of central and northern Mesopotamia that had been occupied by Puzur-Inshushinak, possibly at the expense of the Gutians, and  conquered Susa.

Ur-Nammu was also responsible for ordering the construction of a number of ziggurats, including the Great Ziggurat of Ur.

He was killed in a battle against the Gutians after he had been abandoned by his army.Ur-Nammu's death in battle was commemorated in a long Sumerian elegiac composition, "The Death of Ur-Nammu". He was succeeded by his son Shulgi.
The king seems to have married family members to important people all over the empire to secure loyalty in provinces. One example is his daughter Simat-Ištaran, who was married to a local general.

Deification debate
Ur-Nammu is notable for having been one of the few Mesopotamian kings of the third millennium BC who was not deified after his death. This is testified by the posthumous Sumerian literature which never includes the divine determinative before Ur-Nammu's name (this can be seen on the transliterations for the texts on ETCSL), the themes of divine abandonment in "The Death of Ur-Nammu", and the fact that Shulgi promoted his lineage to members of the legendary Uruk dynasty as opposed to Ur-Nammu. While some translations of Sumerian texts had included the divine determinative before Ur-Nammu's name more recent evidence indicates this was a mistaken addition. Despite this, the belief that the king was deified after death has been expressed just as recently, demonstrating a lack of certainty on this issue (though these were written during the same year as the new interpretations of the evidence and thus could not refer to them). Sharlach has more recently noted that favour for Ur-Nammu not having been deified has been accepted by many scholars.

Year names of Ur-Nammu
Several of the year names of Ur-Nammu are known, documenting the major events of his reign. The main year names are:

 "Ur-Namma (is) King"
 "Ur-Namma declared an amnesty (misharum) in the land"
 "The wall of Ur was built"
 "The king received kingship from Nippur"
 "The temple of Nanna was built"
 "The 'A-Nintu' canal was dug"
 "The land of Guti was destroyed"
 "The god Lugal-bagara was brought into his temple"

Artifacts

See also

Nammu: the god Ur-Nammu was named after.

Notes

External links

Site drawings of the temple built by Ur-Nammu at Ur to the moon god Nanna.
Nabonidus dedication to the Ziggurat
The Code of Ur-Nammu at Britannica
Foundation Figurine of King Ur-Nammu at the Oriental Institute of Chicago
 
 The face of Ur-Namma. A realistic statue of Ur-Namma shows us how he may have looked.
 A brief description of the reign of Ur-Namma.
 I am Ur-Namma. The life and death of Ur-Namma, as told in Babylonian literature.

|-

Sumerian kings
Ancient legislators
22nd-century BC Sumerian kings
21st-century BC Sumerian kings
Third Dynasty of Ur